The Celiac Sprue Association (CSA) is the largest non-profit celiac disease support group in the United States, with over 125 chapters and 65 resource units across the country, and over 10,000 members worldwide.

History
The Midwestern Celiac Sprue Association (MCSA) was formed in 1977 by Pat Murphy Garst of Des Moines, Iowa. MCSA officially changed its name to Celiac Sprue Association/United States of America, Inc. in 1986.

Mission statement
Celiac Sprue Association/United States of America, Inc. (CSA/USA, Inc) is a member-based non-profit organization dedicated to helping individuals with celiac disease and dermatitis herpetiformis worldwide through education, research, and support. In particular, it has information for its members on following a gluten-free diet.

External links
 Official website

Disability organizations based in the United States